The Sylvanus Thayer Award is an honor given annually by the United States Military Academy at West Point to an individual whose character and accomplishments exemplifies the motto of West Point. The award is named after the 'Father of the Military Academy,' Colonel Sylvanus Thayer. The awardee is selected by, and the award is endowed by, a committee formed from the West Point Association of Graduates. It has been awarded annually since 1958 and is the closest recognition West Point has to granting an honorary degree.

Official description of the award 
Since 1958, the West Point Association of Graduates has presented the SYLVANUS THAYER AWARD to an outstanding citizen of the United States whose service and accomplishments in the national interest exemplify personal devotion to the ideals expressed in the West Point motto: DUTY, HONOR, COUNTRY.

The recipient of the Sylvanus Thayer Award receives a medal with a bust in profile of Thayer on one side, with the inscription: "The Sylvanus Thayer Medal Awarded by the Association of Graduates, United States Military Academy, for Outstanding Service to the Nation."  The reverse side carries the coat of arms of the Military Academy and the words "West Point" and "Duty, Honor, Country".  Around the edge of the medal are inscribed the name of the recipient and the year of presentation.  In addition to receiving the medal, the recipient's portrait and name are inscribed on a memorial in the Thayer Award Room in Taylor Hall, the headquarters building of West Point.

Criteria 
Active-duty and retired American military servicemen or women are eligible for the award, but the majority are civilians who contributed to the US Government, the US Armed Forces, US national security or diplomacy, US civil rights or the enduring support of veterans in a positive way. The recipient must be a US Citizen, must not be a United States Military Academy graduate, and must receive the award in person during a ceremony with the entire Corps of Cadets. Early in its existence, three West Point graduates received the award - Dwight Eisenhower, Douglas MacArthur, and Omar Bradley - but graduates are no longer eligible. One United States Naval Academy graduate, Ross Perot, has received the award.

Recipients 
The following is the list of the award's recipients:
1958 – Dr. Ernest Lawrence (nuclear scientist, Nobel laureate)
1959 – Secretary John Foster Dulles
1960 – Ambassador Henry Cabot Lodge, Jr.
1961 – General of the Army Dwight D. Eisenhower (President of the United States)
1962 – General of the Army Douglas MacArthur (Medal of Honor recipient)
1963 – Secretary John J. McCloy (Assistant Secretary of War, Allied High Commission and President of the World Bank)
1964 – Secretary Robert A. Lovett
1965 – Ambassador James B. Conant (President of Harvard University, United States Ambassador to West Germany)
1966 – Congressman Carl Vinson (Chairman of the House Armed Services Committee)
1967 – Cardinal Francis Spellman (Archbishop of New York)
1968 – Mr. Bob Hope (entertainer)
1969 – Secretary Dean Rusk
1970 – Ambassador Ellsworth Bunker
1971 – Mr. Neil Armstrong (astronaut)
1972 – Pastor Billy Graham (evangelist)
1973 – General of the Army Omar Bradley
1974 – Ambassador Robert Daniel Murphy
1975 – Governor W. Averell Harriman (Governor of New York, Under Secretary of State for Political Affairs)
1976 – Secretary Gordon Gray (National Security Advisor, United States Secretary of the Army) 
1977 – Secretary Robert T. Stevens (United States Secretary of the Army, businessman)
1978 – Mr. James R. Killian Jr. (President of the Massachusetts Institute of Technology, Chairman of President's Intelligence Advisory Board)
1979 – Ambassador Clare Boothe Luce (Congresswomen)
1980 – Father Theodore M. Hesburgh (President of University of Notre Dame)
1981 – Administrator James E. Webb (Administrator of NASA)
1982 – Mr. David Packard (businessman, Deputy Secretary of Defense)
1983 – General James H. Doolittle (Medal of Honor recipient)
1984 – Secretary Stanley Rogers Resor (United States Secretary of the Army)
1985 – Secretary Frank Pace Jr. (United States Secretary of the Army, businessman)
1986 – Dr. Edward Teller (nuclear scientist)
1987 – Senator Barry Goldwater
1988 – Chief Justice Warren E. Burger (Chief Justice)
1989 – President Ronald Reagan
1990 – Senator Mike Mansfield
1991 – Secretary Paul H. Nitze (Deputy Secretary of Defense, Secretary of the Navy)
1992 – Secretary George Shultz
1993 – Secretary Cyrus R. Vance
1994 – President George Herbert Walker Bush
1995 – Congresswomen Barbara Jordan (civil rights leader)
1996 – General John W. Vessey
1997 – Mr. Walter Cronkite (newscaster)
1998 – General Colin Powell (US Secretary of State)
1999 – Mr. Norman R. Augustine (businessman, Under Secretary of the Army)
2000 – Secretary Henry Alfred Kissinger
2001 – Senator Daniel K. Inouye (Medal of Honor recipient)
2002 – The American Soldier
2003 – General Gordon R. Sullivan
2004 – Senator Robert J. Dole
2005 – Justice Sandra Day O'Connor
2006 – Mr. Tom Brokaw (news reporter and author)
2007 – General Frederick Kroesen
2008 – Secretary William Perry
2009 – Mr. H. Ross Perot (businessman)
2010 – Secretary James Baker
2011 – Secretary Robert M. Gates
2012 – Congressman Ike Skelton (Chairman of the House Armed Services Committee)
2013 – Secretary Madeleine Albright
2014 – Secretary Condoleezza Rice
2015 – Mr. Gary Sinise (entertainer, advocate for veterans)
2016 – Director Robert S. Mueller
2017 – President George W. Bush
2018 – Secretary Leon E. Panetta (Director of the Central Intelligence Agency, White House Chief of Staff, Congressman)
2019 – General Ann E. Dunwoody
2020 – Ambassador Ryan Crocker
2021 - Doctor Mae C. Jemison
2022 - Mr.  Kenneth Fisher (Advocate for Veterans and Wounded Warriors)

Notes

References

External links

Audio of speech by 1962 award recipient General Douglas MacArthur

Thayer Award
Awards established in 1958
United States Military Academy
1958 establishments in New York (state)